Kesovo is a rural locality (a village) in Turgenevskoye Rural Settlement, Melenkovsky District, Vladimir Oblast, Russia. The population was 35 as of 2010.

Geography 
Kesovo is located 25 km northeast of Melenki (the district's administrative centre) by road. Maksimovka is the nearest rural locality.

References 

Rural localities in Melenkovsky District